Jim Martin is an American puppeteer, best known for his roles on Sesame Street. As part of the cast, he has won an Emmy Award. He has been nominated multiple times, and won for "Outstanding Achievement in Costume Design/Styling" at the Emmys, also for Sesame Street.

Career
In the 1970s, Martin puppeteered a character in another local show, Adventure Time.

Martin performed as one of the main puppet characters on the live-action/animated kids TV series The Great Space Coaster (1981–1986) as Gary Gnu - "This is Gary Gnu, your no-gnews gnews reporter" and as the villain M.T. Promises.

Martin was a producer and director on the show Johnny and the Sprites, and is the creator and owner of the Anybody Pupplets.

At the Visitors Center of Herr's Corporation in Nottingham, Pennsylvania, Martin's work as Chipper was featured in the film used to preview visitors for the snack factory tour.

His present venture is called Costume Armour, Inc.

Filmography
Muppet Meeting Films - Smilin' Ed
Sesame Street - Preston Rabbit, Harry the Hopping Haystack, Betty Lou's Dad, Additional Muppets
The Puzzle Place - Ben Olafson, Green Piece Police
The Book of Pooh - Eeyore (assistant)
Elmo's World - Computer, Cactus
Eureeka's Castle
Johnny and the Sprites
Once Upon a Tree - Forrest the Beaver
The Great Space Coaster
Dragon Tales - Additional Voices
Between The Lions
Jim Henson Play Along Video - Additional Muppets
Bear in the Big Blue House
The Planet Matzah Ball

Martin was a Guest of Honor at Anthrocon 2010, the world's largest furry convention, and also at Eurofurence 17, Europe's largest furry convention, in 2011.

References 

Year of birth missing (living people)
Place of birth missing (living people)
American puppeteers
Living people
Sesame Street Muppeteers
Point Park University alumni
Male actors from Pittsburgh